The Ponui or Ponui Island Donkey is a breed and feral population of domestic donkey from Ponui Island, in the Hauraki Gulf off New Zealand. It is the only feral donkey in New Zealand. It may also be called the New Zealand Donkey.

History 

Frederick Chamberlin bought Ponui Island from the New Zealand government in 1854. Donkeys were brought to the island together with other livestock from New South Wales, and a feral population established itself. The Ponui Island Donkey now has formal breed status, and some are distributed in mainland New Zealand. It is registered by the Donkey & Mule Society of New Zealand. The Ponui is listed as 'rare' by the Rare Breeds Conservation Society of New Zealand; it is not among the New Zealand livestock breeds reported to the DAD-IS database of the Food and Agriculture Organization of the United Nations.

Characteristics 

The Ponui donkey is docile and sturdy. It is usually light dun in colour, but may be chocolate; broken-coloured donkeys cannot be registered.

See also 
Feral donkeys in Australia

References 

Mammals of New Zealand
Donkey breeds originating in New Zealand
Feral donkeys